William Morris Sparks (April 28, 1872 – January 7, 1950) was a United States circuit judge of the United States Court of Appeals for the Seventh Circuit.

Education and career

Born in Charlottesville, Indiana, Sparks received an Artium Baccalaureus degree from DePauw University in 1896, attended Indiana Law School (now Indiana University Robert H. McKinney School of Law), and read law to enter the Bar in 1896. He was a deputy prosecuting attorney of Rush County, Indiana from 1896 to 1898, then entered private practice in Rushville, Indiana from 1897 to 1901. He was a member of the Indiana House of Representatives from 1901 to 1903. He was a Judge of the 16th Judicial Circuit Court of Indiana from 1904 to 1910, returning to private practice in Rushville from 1910 to 1914, and again assuming his Circuit Court judgeship from 1914 to 1929.

Federal judicial service

On October 25, 1929, Sparks was nominated by President Herbert Hoover to a seat on the United States Court of Appeals for the Seventh Circuit vacated by Judge Albert B. Anderson. Sparks was confirmed by the United States Senate on October 31, 1929, and received his commission the same day. He served as Chief Judge and as a member of the Judicial Conference of the United States in 1948, assuming senior status on November 13, 1948. Sparks served in that capacity until his death on January 7, 1950, in Rushville.

References

Sources
 

1872 births
1950 deaths
Indiana state court judges
Members of the Indiana House of Representatives
Judges of the United States Court of Appeals for the Seventh Circuit
United States court of appeals judges appointed by Herbert Hoover
20th-century American judges
DePauw University alumni
Indiana University alumni
United States federal judges admitted to the practice of law by reading law